Pantuwaraya Lake National Park is a protected area of the Philippines located in barangay Pantao Raya in the municipality of Saguiaran, Lanao del Sur. The park covers an area of 20 hectares comprising Lake Pantao Raya and surrounding area. It was declared a national park in 1965 by virtue of Republic Act No. 4190.

The park's location in the Lake Lanao-Agus River Watershed Area makes it an important site for conservation efforts. This area supplies much of the region's water and powers the Agus Hydroelectric Power Plant that provides 70% of Mindanao's electricity. The park is accessible via the Iligan-Marawi road which also contains other important lakes and reservoirs in its vicinity including Basak Lake, Laguna de Calaganan, Talao Lake and Agus Lake.

References

See also
List of national parks of the Philippines

National parks of the Philippines
Protected areas established in 1965
1965 establishments in the Philippines
Geography of Lanao del Sur
Tourist attractions in Lanao del Sur